Acacia maconochieana, also known as Mullan wattle, is a shrub or tree of the genus Acacia and the subgenus Plurinerves that is endemic to an arid area of central Australia.

Description
Like most species of Acacia it has phyllodes rather than true leaves. It blooms in October and produces yellow flowers.

Taxonomy
The species was first formally described by the botanist Leslie Pedley in 1986 as a part of the work Acacia maconochieana (Mimosaceae), a new species from semi-arid Australia as described in the journal Austrobaileya. It was reclassified by Pedley as Racosperma maconochieanum in 2003 then returned to genus Acacia in 2006.

Distribution
It is native to an area in the Northern Territory and the Kimberley and Goldfields-Esperance regions of Western Australia and is commonly situated along the margins of lakes that are periodically flooded growing in sandy or loamy soils. The range of the plant extends from around Gregory Salt Lake in the west through to around Nongra Lake in the Tanami Desert in the east where it is usually a part of low open forest or woodland or open scrubland communities.

Aboriginal names 
The Walmajarri people of the Paruku IPA in the Kimberley call this wattle Wirimangurru. Other Aboriginal names are:Jaru: gunanduru, wirrimangurru and  Ngarinyman: Gunadurr.

See also
 List of Acacia species

References

maconochieana
Acacias of Western Australia
Flora of the Northern Territory
Taxa named by Leslie Pedley
Plants described in 1986